Lizzie or Lizzy is a nickname for Elizabeth or Elisabet, often given as an independent name in the United States, especially in the late 19th century.

Lizzie can also be the shortened version of Lizeth, Lissette or Lizette.

People
 Elizabeth II (1926–2022), Queen of the United Kingdom 
 Elizabeth Sewall Alcott (1835–1858), real-life model for the character Beth March in the novel Little Women
 Marie Elisabeth Lizzy Ansingh (1875–1959), Dutch painter
 Lizzie Arlington, alias of Elizabeth Stroud, regarded by many historians as the first female to play organized baseball in the 19th century
 Lizzie Arnot (born 1996), Scottish footballer
 Elizabeth Mary Lizzie Deignan (née Armitstead) (born 1988), world champion British track and road racing cyclist
 Lizzy Bardsley (born 1973), English media and television personality
 Elizabeth Bolden (1890–2006), world's oldest person at the time of her death
 Lizzie Borden (1860–1927), tried and acquitted for the notorious murder of her parents
 Elizabeth Anne Lizzy Caplan (born 1982), American actress
 Lizzie Compton (born 1847), woman who disguised herself as a man in order to fight for the Union in the American Civil War
 Lizzie Petit Cutler (1831–1902), writer
 Elisabeth Carolina Lizzy van Dorp (1872–1945), Dutch lawyer, economist, politician and feminist
 Lizzie Evans (1864 or 1865 – ?), American vaudeville and musical theatre entertainer
 Margaret Elizabeth Lizzie Crozier French (1851–1926), American educator, women's suffragist and social reform activist
Lizzy, former stage name of Park Soo-ah (born 1992), former member of Kpop girl group After School
 Lizzy Gardiner (born 1966), Australian Academy Award-winning costume designer
 Elizabeth Lizzie Greenwood-Hughes, English television presenter
 Lizzie Grey, stage name of Stephen Perry, American rock guitarist
 Lizzie Grubman (born 1971), American publicist
 Lizzie Holmes (1850–1926), American anarchist, editor 
 Lizzie Hopley, British actress and writer
 Lizzie Halliday (1859–1918), Irish-American serial killer
 Elizabeth Jane Lizzy Igasan (born 1982), field hockey defender from New Zealand
 Lizzie Lloyd King (born 1847), American alleged murderer deemed mentally unfit to stand trial
 Emilie Augusta Louise Lizzy Lind af Hageby (1878–1963), Swedish feminist and animal rights advocate
 Elizabeth Lizzy Lovette, Australian radio presenter and TV presenter
 Lizzie Lloyd King (born 1847), American alleged murderer
 Elizabeth Magie (1866–1948), inventor of a predecessor of the game of Monopoly
 Martine-Elizabeth Lizzy Mercier Descloux (1956–2004), French singer and musician, writer and painter
 Elizabeth Lizzie Mickery, British writer and former actress
 Lizzie Miles (1895–1963), stage name of Elizabeth Mary Landreaux, African American blues singer
 Lizzy Pattinson, English singer and songwriter
 Elizabeth Siddal (1829–1862), English artists' model, poet and artist
Lizzie Shabalala, South African politician
 Lizzie Caswall Smith (1870–1958), British photographer
 Elizabeth Ann Lizzie Velásquez (born 1989), American motivational speaker, author, and YouTuber
 Lizzie Webb, often known as Mad Lizzie, English television presenter of exercise routines
 Lizzie West (born 1973), American singer/songwriter
 Lizzy Yarnold (born 1988), British skeleton racer
 Lizzie Yu Der Ling (1885–1944), better known as Princess Der Ling, Chinese-American writer of several memoirs
 Lizzie van Zyl (1894–1901), South African child inmate of the Bloemfontein concentration camp during the Second Boer War

Fictional characters
 Elizabeth Bennet, from Jane Austen's Pride and Prejudice, often called Lizzy by her friends and family
 Lizzie Devine, in Codename: Kids Next Door
 Lizzie Griffiths, a nine-year-old girl from the movie Tinker Bell and the Great Fairy Rescue
 Lizzie Hearts, the teenage daughter of the Queen of Hearts from the Mattel franchise Ever After High
 Lizzie Lakely, from the British soap opera Emmerdale
 the title character of Lizzie McGuire, a Disney Channel television series
 Lizzie Ramesy, a pirate from the video game Age of Empires III
 Lizzie Spaulding, from the American soap opera Guiding Light
 Lizzy Watson, the twin sister of Nicki Watson from the 2013 horror film Carrie
 The title character of the 2000 children's novel Lizzie Zipmouth
 Lizzy (South Park)
 Lizzie (Cars), a female car from the Disney Pixar animated film Cars and its two sequels
 Lizzy, from the Midway arcade game series Rampage
 Lizzie Saltzman, a witch and one of the daughters of Alaric Saltzman from the TV series Legacies
 Lizzie Samuels, a young psychotic girl from the TV series The Walking Dead
 Lizzy Taylor, a girl character that uses a wheelchair in Postman Pat

Other
 Westlothiana or Lizzie the Lizard, a fossil discovered in Bathgate, West Lothian
 Lizzie (mascot), mascot of the 2000 Paralympics
Lizzie (2018 film), biographical thriller film based on Lizzie Borden

See also
 Liz

English feminine given names
English-language feminine given names
Hypocorisms